Shinn may refer to:

Places
Shinn, Fremont, California
Mount Shinn
 Mount Shinn (California)
Horace J. and Ann S. Shinn Cottage

People with the surname
Blake Shinn, Australian jockey
Charles Howard Shinn (1852–1924), American forester and author
Chris Shinn, American singer-songwriter
Christopher Shinn, American playwright
David H. Shinn (1940- ), American diplomat
Earl Shinn (1838-1886), American art critic 
Everett Shinn (1876-1953), American painter 
Florence Scovel Shinn (1871-1940), American artist and book illustrator 
George Shinn (1941-), American entrepreneur and former owner of the Charlotte/New Orleans  (NBA) Hornets
Larry Shinn, (1942- ), President of Berea College from 1994 to 2012.
Michelle Shinn, American laser scientist
Milicent Shinn (1858–1940), American child psychologist
Moses F. Shinn (1809- ?), American minister
Nick Shinn (1952- ), English font designer
Roger L. Shinn (1917-2013), American theologian
Sharon Shinn (1957- ), American novelist
William Norton Shinn (1782-1871)

Other uses
Ógra Shinn Féin, youth wing of the Irish political party Sinn Féin 
Shinn Asuka, fictional character
 George and Eulalie Shinn, fictional characters in the musical and movie The Music Man